Rochelle Tamarua is a New Zealand rugby league referee. Born in Auckland, New Zealand, Tamarua is of Maori and Cook Island descent.

She was the first woman to referee in the Fox Premiership, the leading domestic rugby league competition of the Auckland Rugby League. 

In 2017 Tamarua took time away from refereeing to concentrate on running her own restaurant but returned to the sport in 2018. Continuing her career, she took a job with the Auckland Rugby League as the league's referees development officer.  On the pitch she continued to referee domestic games and in 2022 took charge of several games in the National Rugby League (NRL) Women's National Championship in Australia.  In August 2022 she became the first New Zealand woman to referee a match in the NRL Women's Premiership (NRLW).

Tamarua was one of only two NZRL referees selected for the officials team at the 2021 Rugby League World Cup in England.

References

New Zealand rugby league referees
People from Auckland
New Zealand people of Māori descent
New Zealand sportspeople of Cook Island descent
Living people
Year of birth missing (living people)